Piroska Reichard (26 September 1884 – 1 January 1943) was a Hungarian-Jewish poet, critic, and translator.

Biography
Piroska Reichard was born in Carpathian Ruthenia to Jewish parents Ernesztina and Márk Reichard. She attended secondary school in Miskolc and went on to complete a teacher's diploma and doctorate at the University of Budapest. She afterwards became a high school teacher.

Her work first appeared in the literary journal Nyugat, to which she became a regular contributor, publishing some eighty pieces between 1908 and 1941. She also translated into Hungarian the works of Nietzsche, Edgar Allan Poe, and others, and wrote essays, short stories, and children's literature. She was best known, however, for her poetry, which frequently explored the theme of solitude. Her most notable collections of verse are Az életen kívül ('Out of Life,' 1911) and Őszi üdvözlet ('Autumn Greetings,' 1922).

Reichard's work was recognized by a Baumgarten Prize in 1932. She fled persecution during the Holocaust in Hungary, ultimately committing suicide on 1 January 1943.

Partial bibliography

References

1884 births
1943 suicides
20th-century Hungarian poets
Jewish women writers
Hungarian women poets
Hungarian translators
Translators to Hungarian
People from Berehove
Suicides by Jews during the Holocaust
Jewish Hungarian-language writers
20th-century Hungarian educators
Jewish educators
20th-century women educators
Hungarian Jews who died in the Holocaust
Translators of Friedrich Nietzsche
Translators of Edgar Allan Poe
Suicides in Hungary